Pteralopex is a genus of large megabats in the family Pteropodidae. Species in this genus are commonly known as "monkey-faced bats". They are restricted to Solomon Islands rain forests in Melanesia, and all species are seriously threatened, being rated as either endangered or critically endangered by IUCN. Two species, P. taki and P. flanneryi, have been described since 2000.

Species
The Fijian monkey-faced bat, formerly placed in this genus, has recently been transferred to the monotypic Mirimiri.

 Bougainville monkey-faced bat, Pteralopex anceps
 Guadalcanal monkey-faced bat, Pteralopex atrata
 Greater monkey-faced bat, Pteralopex flanneryi
 Montane monkey-faced bat, Pteralopex pulchra
 New Georgian monkey-faced bat, Pteralopex taki

References

 
Bat genera
Taxa named by Oldfield Thomas